The Philadelphia Force were a professional basketball team in the National Rookie League based in Philadelphia, Pennsylvania.  The team is notable for having been defeated by the Baltimore Blaze in the only NRL Championship 100 to 93 on August 9, 2001.  With the collapse of the National Rookie League, the team ceased operations.

References

External links
Our Sports Central site

Defunct basketball teams in Pennsylvania